Ponza is the largest island of the Italian Pontine Islands archipelago.

Ponza may also refer to:

Ponza, Lazio, the commune on Ponza, Italy
Ponza, Bell County, Kentucky, United States
Battle of Ponza (disambiguation), multiple battles

People
Lorenzo Ponza
Michela Ponza

See also
Pons (disambiguation)
Ponsa